Events from the year 2004 in Russia.

Incumbents
 President: Vladimir Putin
 Prime Minister: Mikhail Kasyanov to February 24 Viktor Khristenko as Acting Prime Minister to March 5 Mikhail Fradkov

Events

 14 March - Vladimir Putin wins the presidential election and secures his second term as president.
The Moscow Manege fire.
16 March - Arkhangelsk explosion
 9 May - Assassination of the Pro-Russian Chechen President Akhmad Kadyrov in Grozny.
 13 August–29 August - Russia competes at the Summer Olympics in Athens, Greece, and wins 27 gold, 27 silver and 38 bronze medals.
 29 August - Alu Alkhanov succeeds Kadyrov as President of Chechnya following elections.
 1 September - Beslan school hostage crisis: Chechen separatists take over 1,000 hostages at a school in North Ossetia–Alania.
 3 September - Beslan school hostage crisis: Russian troops storm the school. As a result of the siege, over 330 people, including 186 children, were killed.

 26 December - 9 Russians are among the victims of the 2004 Indian Ocean tsunami.

Sport 
2004 Summer Olympics - Afina - 3rd place

Undated 
The Alexander Nevsky prize, a Russian national historical-literary competition is established.

Births
 28 March – Anna Shcherbakova, figure skater
 14 April – Anastasia Tarakanova, figure skater
 23 June – Alexandra Trusova, figure skater
 6 December – Lala Kramarenko, rhythmic gymnast

Notable deaths

February

 13 February - Zelimkhan Yandarbiyev
 22 February - David Neiman, 82, Russian-born American rabbi, archaeologist and theologian.
 28 February - Ruslan Gelayev

May

 9 May - Akhmad Kadyrov
 22 May - Mikhail Voronin, gymnast (born 1945)

See also
List of Russian films of 2004

References

External links

 
2000s in Russia
Years of the 21st century in Russia